Li Chia-hsun (born 5 July 1976) is a Taiwanese luger. He competed in the men's singles event at the 2002 Winter Olympics.

References

External links
 
 

1976 births
Living people
Taiwanese male lugers
Olympic lugers of Taiwan
Lugers at the 2002 Winter Olympics
Place of birth missing (living people)